Sir Robert James Sainsbury (October 24, 1906April 2, 2000), was the son of John Benjamin Sainsbury (the eldest son of John James Sainsbury, the founder of Sainsbury's supermarkets). Along with his wife Lisa, they began the collection of modern and tribal art housed at the Sainsbury Centre for Visual Arts in Norwich.

Early life
Robert Sainsbury was educated at Haileybury College and Pembroke College, Cambridge, before qualifying as an accountant.

Business career
In 1930, he joined the family grocery business founded by his grandfather and became joint president almost 40 years later.

Robert Sainsbury was an advocate of better conditions for the retail chain's employees. Pensions and sickness benefits for all staff came in 1935; overtime payments were introduced in 1941; and in 1962 the five-day work week was standard.

Eight years after he joined the family firm, his father, John Benjamin Sainsbury, retired due to ill-health. Robert Sainsbury and his elder brother, Alan Sainsbury, became joint general managers. While Alan Sainsbury took charge of trading matters, Robert Sainsbury specialized in administration, finance, and personnel. It was a happy partnership that lasted more than 30 years.

The Second World War broke out a year after Robert Sainsbury's promotion and they rationed supplies at the 250 Sainsbury's shops.

Robert Sainsbury was a strong supporter of the Beveridge Report, which cradled the welfare state into being. By the end of the war, Robert Sainsbury had cut the long hours in which staff was under with men conscripted and women on war work.

The 1950s brought self-service supermarkets. Over the period of his joint general management approach which introduced  deputy chairpersonship and chairpersonship positions (he became deputy chairperson when his father died in 1956, and succeeded his brother as chairperson in 1967), the company's turnover increased from £45m to £166m and the number of employees rose fourfold.

By the time he retired as chairperson in 1969, Robert Sainsbury had been a principal architect of the supergrocer's fortunes, which ensured its continuing success until the beginning of the 1990s.

Charitable works
Sainsbury was as an art collector and benefactor who gave his collection to the University of East Anglia. He was granted a knighthood in 1967 for his services to the arts.

In 1973, Robert Sainsbury made a gift to the University of East Anglia of several hundred paintings along with drawings and sculptures from around the world. Designed by the architect Norman Foster and with an endowment of £3m from Sainsbury's son David, the Sainsbury Centre for Visual Arts, was built to house the works and opened in spring 1978.

Marriage and family 
In 1937, Sainsbury married Lisa van den Bergh (March 3, 1912 – February 6, 2014), daughter of Professor Simon van den Bergh and Sonia Pokrojski. They had four children:

 Elizabeth (July 19, 1938 – August 14,1977)
 David Sainsbury, Baron Sainsbury of Turville (b. October 24, 1940)
 Celia (b. 1945)
 Annabel (b. 1948), married Peter Kanabus, with two children

References

1906 births
2000 deaths
English people of Dutch-Jewish descent
People educated at Haileybury and Imperial Service College
Alumni of Pembroke College, Cambridge
English businesspeople in retailing
English philanthropists
English art collectors
People associated with the University of East Anglia
Knights Bachelor
Robert
20th-century English businesspeople